Observant may refer to:

 Making an observation
 Having observance of a 
 holiday (public, religious, etc.)
 religious law or spiritual practice (worship, diet, taboo, etc.)
 Observant, Franciscan friar
 The Observants, one-eyed ghosts in Danny Phantom
 Ob(Servant), 2008 death metal album by Psycroptic
 Rite of Strict Observance, former Rite of Freemasonry

See also 

 Observer (disambiguation)
 Observance (disambiguation)